The 2001 MTV Video Music Awards aired live on September 6, 2001, honoring the best music videos from June 10, 2000, to June 8, 2001. The show was hosted by Jamie Foxx at the Metropolitan Opera House in New York City.

Highlights of the show included a surprise appearance by Michael Jackson at the end of NSYNC's performance and an iconic performance from Britney Spears, in which she danced to "I'm a Slave 4 U" while utilizing a host of live animals, including a Albino python draped over her shoulders. Macy Gray wore a dress with a promotional message, instructing viewers to buy her new album. Andy Dick portrayed a fictional cousin of Christina Aguilera, Daphne Aguilera, who, in a skit, "attacked" Aguilera in the audience. The show also featured memorials for Aaliyah and Joey Ramone. Many of the night's winners dedicated awards to the two fallen musicians over the course of the telecast.

Fatboy Slim took home six Moonmen, the most of the evening, for his "Weapon of Choice" video, which featured the dancing talents of actor Christopher Walken. NSYNC's "Pop" took home four awards. Christina Aguilera, Lil' Kim, Mýa, Pink and Missy "Misdemeanor" Elliott took home two awards, including the Video of the Year award, for their collaborative rendition of "Lady Marmalade".

The World Trade Center towers that featured in Limp Bizkit's winning rock video were destroyed in the September 11 attacks five days later.

Background
MTV announced on July 23 that the 2001 Video Music Awards would be held on September 6 at the Metropolitan Opera House in New York. Nominees were announced on the same day. The ceremony marked the introduction of the fan-voted MTV2 Award, which was meant to honor videos that debuted on MTV2. Jamie Foxx was announced as host on August 7. The ceremony broadcast was preceded by the 2001 MTV Video Music Awards Opening Act. Hosted by Kurt Loder and SuChin Pak with reports from Chris Connelly, John Norris, Iann Robinson, Sway, and Gideon Yago, the broadcast featured red carpet interviews, pre-taped features on DMX, Pink's and Ja Rule's outfit selection, and a challenge to remix music from Carmen, and performances from Alien Ant Farm and City High featuring Eve. Viewers were able to vote on which outfit Pink and Ja Rule should wear prior to the pre-show.

Performances

Presenters

Pre-show
 Chris Connelly and Gideon Yago – announced the winners of the professional categories and Breakthrough Video

Main show
 Bond – performed during the opening act
 Backstreet Boys – presented Best Hip-Hop Video
 Will Ferrell – parodied the Tim Commerford incident from the 2000 VMAs
 Destiny's Child – presented Best Direction in a Video
 Janet Jackson – introduced a tribute to Aaliyah
 Missy Elliott, Timbaland, Ginuwine and Rashad Haughton – paid tribute to Aaliyah
 Jessica Simpson, Mandy Moore and Dream – presented Best Dance Video
 Dale Earnhardt Jr. – introduced Linkin Park
 Julia Stiles and Chris Kattan – performed an "interpretive dance" to the Viewer's Choice Award nominees
 Christina Aguilera, Lil' Kim, Mýa and Pink – presented Best Male Video
 Will Smith – presented Best Female Video
 Nelly, Macy Gray and Mary J. Blige – presented Best New Artist in a Video
 Christopher Walken – introduced 'N Sync
 Moby, Eve and Gwen Stefani – presented the MTV2 Award
 Andy Dick (as "Daphne Aguilera") – performed a snippet of "Naughty Baby Did a No-No" (Viewer's Choice Award vignette)
 Tenacious D – presented Best Group Video
 Usher and Estella Warren – presented Best R&B Video
 Mark Wahlberg – introduced rapper DMX and introduced Staind with him
 P. Diddy and Ben Stiller – presented Best Rap Video
 Triumph the Insult Comic Dog – appeared in a vignette about the Viewer's Choice Award
 Nikka Costa and Sheryl Crow – presented Best Pop Video
 Shakira and Busta Rhymes – introduced Missy "Misdemeanor" Elliott, Ludacris, Nelly Furtado and Trina
 Jon Bon Jovi and Jewel – presented Best Video from a Film
 Carson Daly – presented the Video Vanguard Award
 Ramones (Johnny, Marky and C.J.) – received a tribute from U2 during their Video Vanguard acceptance speech
 Johnny Knoxville and Snoop Dogg – presented Best Rock Video
 Ananda Lewis – presented Viewer's Choice with the winners of MTV's "Last Fans Standing" contest
 OutKast – introduced Britney Spears
 Kid Rock and Mick Jagger – presented Video of the Year

Winners and nominees
Nominees were selected by approximately 500 members of the music industry and MTV viewers. Winners in general categories, except for the Viewer's Choice awards and MTV2 Award, were selected by members of the music industry and MTV viewers. Winners in professional categories were selected by members of the music industry. Winners of the Viewer's Choice awards and the MTV2 Award were selected by viewers. Voting for the MTV2 Award and Viewer's Choice award was conducted on MTV's website and, in the case of the latter award, through phone voting that continued through the ceremony broadcast. MTV announced after the broadcast that over five million votes were cast for the Viewer's Choice award and nearly one million votes were cast for the MTV2 Award.

Winners are in bold text.

See also
2001 MTV Europe Music Awards

References

External links
 Official MTV site
 FATBOY SLIM, 'NSYNC, 'LADY MARMALADE' GATHER MOST MOONMEN

2001
MTV Video Music Awards
MTV Video Music Awards
MTV Video Music Awards